Leisure World may refer to:

 Leisure World, Arizona
 Laguna Woods Village, Laguna Woods, California, formerly known as Leisure World
 Leisure World, Seal Beach, California
 Leisure World, Maryland
 MV Leisure World, a cruise ship